River Made to Drown In is a 1997 drama film starring Michael Imperioli, Richard Chamberlain, Ute Lemper and James Duval. Although directed by James Merendino, Merendino had his name removed, and the film is credited to Alan Smithee. River Made to Drown In failed to secure U.S. theatrical distribution, and it was released on DVD and has appeared on here! television.

Plot summary
Allen (Imperioli) is a struggling artist who had formerly worked as a street hustler. He has left that life behind and is involved with Eva (Lemper) his art dealer. His life is upset by the arrival of Thaddeus (Chamberlain), a wealthy lawyer near death from AIDS. Allen had for a time been Thaddeus's "kept boy" and Thaddeus has come to Allen to die. Before he dies, however, he wants Allen to help him find Jaime (Duval), another young hustler who had taken Allen's place with Thaddeus. Thaddeus is worried that he's infected Jaime with HIV and says he wants to care for him financially.

The film follows Allen's efforts to fulfil Thaddeus's final wishes while struggling to maintain his relationship with Eva and avoid the temptation of being drawn back into his former life on the streets.

Cast
 Richard Chamberlain as Thaddeus MacKenzie
 Michael Imperioli as Allen Hayden
 Ute Lemper as Eva Kline
 James Duval as Jaime
 Austin Pendleton as Billy
 Talia Shire as Jaime's Mother
 Mike Starr as Frank
 Richard Riehle as Heavyset Man
 Michael Saucedo as Luis
 James Karen as Ray
 Michael Kearns as Arthur
 Michael O'Hagan as Jack
 Lewis Arquette as Vagabond
 Paul Marius as Turk
 Jon Powell as Martin

DVD release
River Made to Drown In was released on Region 1 DVD on July 1, 2003.

References

External links
 
 
 

1997 films
1997 drama films
1997 LGBT-related films
American LGBT-related films
Films credited to Alan Smithee
HIV/AIDS in American films
American independent films
Films about male prostitution in the United States
Films directed by James Merendino
Films set in Santa Monica, California
1997 independent films
1990s English-language films
1990s American films